Angelina Maccarone is a German film director and writer.

Personal life
Angelina Maccarone was born in Pulheim, Germany, 1965. A child of immigration, she is the daughter of an Italian father - who was also a guest worker - and a German mother who together moved to Germany in the 1960s. Maccarone originally sought a career in music before turning to film. She played the electric guitar and became a lyricist when she was 14 years old. In 1985, she attended the University of Hamburg and majored in German and American Studies.
Maccarone currently lives in Berlin with her partner, film editor Bettina Böhler.

Career
Maccarone has been writing screenplays since 1992.
In that same year, she wrote a screenplay treatment that won the award of the Hamburg Department of Culture, which marked the beginning of her career in film-making. In 1995, Maccarone wrote the final screenplay for a movie with the same name as the treatment, which turned out to be the coming-out comedy  With this film, she made her directorial debut and was nominated for the Telestar award. She then made another film in 1998 titled Everything Will Be Fine (Alles wird gut), which also won an award, as it was the winner of Audience Awards in multiple cities, such as Los Angeles and Toronto. In 2005, Maccarone's feature-film Fremde Haut was released. It is about a gay Muslim woman fleeing from Iran to seek asylum in Germany, and it takes on topics regarding unclear and changing representations of identity as a lesbian Muslim woman. Filmed during the New Queer Cinema movement, Fremde Haut is also noted for its few moments of briefly portraying a lesbian relationship as powerful and free.; It proceeded to win the Jury Grand Prize at the International LGBT Festival in Montreal and the Jury Award for Best Narrative Feature at the Seattle L & G Film Festival.

The next year, Maccarone directed and released Verfolgt, which was finished in Hamburg. Prior to its release, she stated "This will be a scandal." This is most likely due to the controversial plot, where a middle-aged female probation officer is seduced by a 17-year-old male teen in her charge. In 2011, Maccarone wrote and directed a documentary known as Charlotte Rampling: The Look. It tells the British actress' life story as it is revealed through a series of conversations that uncover details about Rampling's career and personal thoughts on life. It was presented at the annual Cannes Film Festival in 2011.

Filmography
, 1995
Everything Will Be Fine, 1998
An Angel's Revenge, 1998
Fremde Haut (Unveiled), 2005
, 2006
Tatort: Wem Ehre gebührt, 2007
Vivere, 2007
Ein Mann, ein Fjord!, 2009
The Look, 2011
Polizeiruf 110: Hexenjagd, 2014

Awards and nominations
1992: Screenplay Treatment Award of the Hamburg Department of Culture - Kommt Mausi raus?!
1995: Nominated for the Telestar Award - Kommt Mausi raus?!
1997: Audience Awards in New York, Toronto, Los Angeles, Paris - Alles wird gut
1998: Honored at the Cologne Conference - An Angel's Revenge
2005: Hessian film award as "Best feature film" - Fremde Haut
2005: Jury Grand Prize at the International LGBT Festival in Montreal - Fremde Haut
2005: Jury Award for Best Narrative Feature at the Seattle L & G Film Festival - Fremde Haut
2006: Golden Leopard at the Locarno Film Festival - Verfolgt
 2006: Best Feature Film at the Paris Lesbian and Feminist Film Festival - Fremde Haut
2007: Nominated for Best Narrative Feature at Tribeca Film Festival - Vivere
2012: Nominated for Best Documentary at German Film Awards - The Look

Charlotte Rampling: The Look (2011) 
Charlotte Rampling: The Look is a 2011 documentary film about the life of English actress, model, and singer Charlotte Rampling. The film delves into the life work of Rampling, who explains in an interview the difficulty of having to perform in films directed completely in languages other than English. Specifically, she notes how performing in various movies in France have allowed her to become completely fluent in French.

Maccarone describes her desire for creating the documentary in an interview with Film Makers Live after submitting the film to the Cannes Film Festival in 2011. She states her passion and respect for Rampling, noting that the film was created "as a gift" and that she wished to look more in depth at how she worked, and her types of work she produced. She also notes that the film was an ode to Rampling's courage, and wanted to use the film to get to know her better.

See also
 List of female film and television directors
 List of lesbian filmmakers
 List of LGBT-related films directed by women

References

Further reading
Presenting Alterity in Angelina Maccarone’s Fremde Haut (2005) and Tatort: Wem Ehre gebürt (2007)
An obscured view of Charlotte Rampling's career and life

External links
Vivere Movie Site
Director's Portrait
Interview with Unveiled Director Angelina Maccarone, AfterEllen.com
Angelina Maccarone IMDb

Living people
1965 births
Film people from North Rhine-Westphalia
German people of Italian descent
LGBT film directors
People from Pulheim
University of Hamburg alumni
German lesbian writers
German LGBT screenwriters
German women screenwriters
German women film directors
Lesbian screenwriters
21st-century LGBT people